Complex analysis, traditionally known as the theory of functions of a complex variable, is the branch of mathematical analysis that investigates functions of complex numbers. It is helpful in many branches of mathematics, including algebraic geometry, number theory, analytic combinatorics, applied mathematics; as well as in physics, including the branches of hydrodynamics, thermodynamics, and particularly quantum mechanics. By extension, use of complex analysis also has applications in engineering fields such as nuclear, aerospace, mechanical and electrical engineering.

As a differentiable function of a complex variable is equal to its Taylor series (that is, it is analytic), complex analysis is particularly concerned with analytic functions of a complex variable (that is, holomorphic functions).

History 

Complex analysis is one of the classical branches in mathematics, with roots in the 18th century and just prior. Important mathematicians associated with complex numbers include Euler, Gauss, Riemann, Cauchy, Gösta Mittag-Leffler, Weierstrass, and many more in the 20th century. Complex analysis, in particular the theory of conformal mappings, has many physical applications and is also used throughout analytic number theory. In modern times, it has become very popular through a new boost from complex dynamics and the pictures of fractals produced by iterating holomorphic functions.  Another important application of complex analysis is in string theory which examines conformal invariants in quantum field theory.

Complex functions 

A complex function is a function from complex numbers to complex numbers. In other words, it is a function that has a subset of the complex numbers as a domain and the complex numbers as a codomain. Complex functions are generally supposed to have a domain that contains a nonempty open subset of the complex plane.

For any complex function, the values  from the domain and their images  in the range may be separated into real and imaginary parts:

 

where  are all real-valued.

In other words, a complex function  may be decomposed into

  and 

i.e., into two real-valued functions of two real variables.

Similarly, any complex-valued function  on an arbitrary set  (is isomorphic to, and therefore, in that sense, it) can be considered as an ordered pair of two real-valued functions:  or, alternatively, as a vector-valued function from  into 

Some properties of complex-valued functions (such as continuity) are nothing more than the corresponding properties of vector valued functions of two real variables. Other concepts of complex analysis, such as differentiability, are direct generalizations of the similar concepts for real functions, but may have very different properties. In particular, every differentiable complex function is analytic (see next section), and two differentiable functions that are equal in a neighborhood of a point are equal on the intersection of their domain (if the domains are connected). The latter property is the basis of the principle of analytic continuation which allows extending every real analytic function in a unique way for getting a complex analytic function whose domain is the whole complex plane with a finite number of curve arcs removed. Many basic and special complex functions are defined in this way, including the complex exponential function, complex logarithm functions, and trigonometric functions.

Holomorphic functions 

 

Superficially, this definition is formally analogous to that of the derivative of a real function. However, complex derivatives and differentiable functions behave in significantly different ways compared to their real counterparts. In particular, for this limit to exist, the value of the difference quotient must approach the same complex number, regardless of the manner in which we approach  in the complex plane. Consequently, complex differentiability has much stronger implications than real differentiability. For instance, holomorphic functions are infinitely differentiable, whereas the existence of the nth derivative need not imply the existence of the (n + 1)th derivative for real functions. Furthermore, all holomorphic functions satisfy the stronger condition of analyticity, meaning that the function is, at every point in its domain, locally given by a convergent power series. This stands in sharp contrast to differentiable real functions; there are infinitely differentiable real functions that are nowhere analytic; see .

Most elementary functions, including the exponential function, the trigonometric functions, and all polynomial functions, extended appropriately to complex arguments as functions  are holomorphic over the entire complex plane, making them entire functions, while rational functions , where p and q are polynomials, are holomorphic on domains that exclude points where q is zero. Such functions that are holomorphic everywhere except a set of isolated points are known as meromorphic functions.

An important property of holomorphic functions is the relationship between the partial derivatives of their real and imaginary components, known as the Cauchy–Riemann conditions.  If , defined by  where  is holomorphic on a region  then for all ,

However, the Cauchy–Riemann conditions do not characterize holomorphic functions, without additional continuity conditions (see Looman–Menchoff theorem).

Holomorphic functions exhibit some remarkable features. Moreover, a holomorphic function on a connected open set is determined by its restriction to any nonempty open subset.

Conformal map

Major results 

One of the central tools in complex analysis is the line integral. The line integral around a closed path of a function that is holomorphic everywhere inside the area bounded by the closed path is always zero, as is stated by the Cauchy integral theorem. The values of such a holomorphic function inside a disk can be computed by a path integral on the disk's boundary (as shown in Cauchy's integral formula). Path integrals in the complex plane are often used to determine complicated real integrals, and here the theory of residues among others is applicable (see methods of contour integration). A "pole" (or isolated singularity) of a function is a point where the function's value becomes unbounded, or "blows up". If a function has such a pole, then one can compute the function's residue there, which can be used to compute path integrals involving the function; this is the content of the powerful residue theorem. The remarkable behavior of holomorphic functions near essential singularities is described by Picard's theorem. Functions that have only poles but no essential singularities are called meromorphic. Laurent series are the complex-valued equivalent to Taylor series, but can be used to study the behavior of functions near singularities through infinite sums of more well understood functions, such as polynomials.

A bounded function that is holomorphic in the entire complex plane must be constant; this is Liouville's theorem. It can be used to provide a natural and short proof for the fundamental theorem of algebra which states that the field of complex numbers is algebraically closed.

If a function is holomorphic throughout a connected domain then its values are fully determined by its values on any smaller subdomain.  The function on the larger domain is said to be analytically continued from its values on the smaller domain.  This allows the extension of the definition of functions, such as the Riemann zeta function, which are initially defined in terms of infinite sums that converge only on limited domains to almost the entire complex plane.  Sometimes, as in the case of the natural logarithm, it is impossible to analytically continue a holomorphic function to a non-simply connected domain in the complex plane but it is possible to extend it to a holomorphic function on a closely related surface known as a Riemann surface.

All this refers to complex analysis in one variable. There is also a very rich theory of complex analysis in more than one complex dimension in which the analytic properties such as power series expansion carry over whereas most of the geometric properties of holomorphic functions in one complex dimension (such as conformality) do not carry over. The Riemann mapping theorem about the conformal relationship of certain domains in the complex plane, which may be the most important result in the one-dimensional theory, fails dramatically in higher dimensions.

A major application of certain complex spaces is in quantum mechanics as wave functions.

See also 
 Complex geometry
 Hypercomplex analysis
 Vector calculus
 List of complex analysis topics
 Monodromy theorem
 Real analysis
 Riemann–Roch theorem
 Runge's theorem

References

Sources 
 Ablowitz, M. J. & A. S. Fokas, Complex Variables: Introduction and Applications (Cambridge, 2003).
 Ahlfors, L., Complex Analysis (McGraw-Hill, 1953).
 Cartan, H., Théorie élémentaire des fonctions analytiques d'une ou plusieurs variables complexes. (Hermann, 1961). English translation, Elementary Theory of Analytic Functions of One or Several Complex Variables. (Addison-Wesley, 1963).
 Carathéodory, C., Funktionentheorie. (Birkhäuser, 1950). English translation, Theory of Functions of a Complex Variable (Chelsea, 1954). [2 volumes.]
 Carrier, G. F., M. Krook, & C. E. Pearson, Functions of a Complex Variable: Theory and Technique. (McGraw-Hill, 1966).
 Conway, J. B., Functions of One Complex Variable. (Springer, 1973).
 Fisher, S., Complex Variables. (Wadsworth & Brooks/Cole, 1990).
 Forsyth, A., Theory of Functions of a Complex Variable (Cambridge, 1893).
 Freitag, E. & R. Busam, Funktionentheorie. (Springer, 1995). English translation, Complex Analysis. (Springer, 2005).
 Goursat, E., Cours d'analyse mathématique, tome 2. (Gauthier-Villars, 1905). English translation, A course of mathematical analysis, vol. 2, part 1: Functions of a complex variable. (Ginn, 1916).
 Henrici, P., Applied and Computational Complex Analysis (Wiley).  [Three volumes: 1974, 1977, 1986.]
 Kreyszig, E., Advanced Engineering Mathematics. (Wiley, 1962).
 Lavrentyev, M. & B. Shabat, Методы теории функций комплексного переменного. (Methods of the Theory of Functions of a Complex Variable). (1951, in Russian).
 Markushevich, A. I., Theory of Functions of a Complex Variable, (Prentice-Hall, 1965). [Three volumes.]
 Marsden & Hoffman, Basic Complex Analysis. (Freeman, 1973).
 Needham, T., Visual Complex Analysis. (Oxford, 1997). http://usf.usfca.edu/vca/
 Remmert, R., Theory of Complex Functions. (Springer, 1990).
 Rudin, W., Real and Complex Analysis. (McGraw-Hill, 1966).
 Shaw, W. T., Complex Analysis with Mathematica (Cambridge, 2006).
 Stein, E. & R. Shakarchi, Complex Analysis. (Princeton, 2003).
 Sveshnikov, A. G. & A. N. Tikhonov, Теория функций комплексной переменной. (Nauka, 1967). English translation, The Theory Of Functions Of A Complex Variable (MIR, 1978).
 Titchmarsh, E. C., The Theory of Functions. (Oxford, 1932).
 Wegert, E., Visual Complex Functions. (Birkhäuser, 2012).
 Whittaker, E. T. & G. N. Watson, A Course of Modern Analysis. (Cambridge, 1902). 3rd ed. (1920)

External links 

 Wolfram Research's MathWorld Complex Analysis Page